Roberto Quiroz and Caio Zampieri were the defending champions but only Quiroz chose to defend his title, partnering Yannick Hanfmann. Quiroz lost in the quarterfinals to Jay Clarke and Kevin Krawietz.

Marcelo Arévalo and Miguel Ángel Reyes-Varela won the title after defeating Clarke and Krawietz 6–1, 6–4 in the final.

Seeds

Draw

References
 Main Draw

San Luis Open Challenger Tour - Doubles
2018 Doubles